Betting Control and Licensing Board (BCLB) governs the authorization of lotteries and prize competition as well as eradication of illegal gambling activities in Kenya. It was established through an Act of Parliament (Chapter 131 Laws of Kenya of 1966). On 1 July 2019,  the Betting Control and Licensing Board postponed renewing the licenses of eight sports betting operators, including Sportpesa, Betin and Betway which controlled 85% of the total betting market in Kenya.

External links 
Betting Control and Licensing Board
Gamemania Kenya

References

Commercial and Financial Services
Gambling regulators
Regulation in Kenya